Jalan Batu Caves (Selangor state route B22) is a major road in Klang Valley region, Selangor, Malaysia. The road connects Selayang in the west to Gombak in the east, passing by Batu Caves. During Thaipusam every year, the road is closed to all traffic for the procession from Sri Mahamariamman Temple in Kuala Lumpur.

Batu Caves spiral bridge
The road used to have a level crossing with the Sentul–Batu Caves railway branch line. As part of the KTM railway double-tracking and electrification project, and the extension of the KTM Komuter service to Batu Caves, the level crossing was eliminated by building a spiral bridge across the railway. Construction began in 2007 and was completed in 2009.

List of junctions

Roads in Selangor